TOI-700 is a red dwarf 101.4 light-years away from Earth located in the Dorado constellation that hosts TOI-700 d, the first Earth-sized exoplanet in the habitable zone discovered by the Transiting Exoplanet Survey Satellite (TESS).

Nomenclature and history 
The acronym "TOI" refers to stars and exoplanets studied by TESS, and is short for: "Transiting Exoplanet Survey Satellite Object of Interest".

Historical overview
The TOI 700 system has been around in its existence from the Proterozoic era for the past 1.5 billion years.

The first known Earth-size planet TOI 700 d was discovered in the system on 3 January 2020 by the Transiting Exoplanet Survey Satellite. Three years later on 15 January 2023, another exoplanet TOI 700 e was discovered. Together, the two habitable exoplanets range in size of mass compared to Earth.

Stellar characteristics
TOI-700 is a red dwarf of spectral class M (much redder, cooler, and dimmer than the sun) that is 40% the mass, 40% the radius and 55% of the temperature of the Sun. The star is bright with low levels of stellar activity. Over the 11 sectors observed with TESS, the star does not show a single white-light flare. The low rotation rate is also an indicator of low stellar activity.

Planetary system
 
Four exoplanets have been detected by TESS to be orbiting the host star TOI-700. All four exoplanets may be tidally locked to TOI-700.

Three papers describe the validation of the planetary system, the follow-up observations of TOI-700 d with the Spitzer Space Telescope and the characterization of TOI-700 d.

The composition of planets b and d is more likely rocky and the composition of planet c is more likely similar to that of Neptune.

The two inner planets might have grown faster and accreted significant gaseous envelopes, but the outer planet formed more slowly and accreted less gas. The innermost planet may later have lost its envelope due to photoevaporation. Another scenario that could explain the arrangement of densities in this system is long-term planetary migration. Planet c might have migrated inwards, but this scenario is more plausible if future studies show that planet c is significantly more massive than planet b or d.

TOI-700 d lies in the habitable zone. It receives 35 times more EUV photons than Earth, but also 50 times less than TRAPPIST-1 e. The host star has low stellar activity. The atmosphere of a planet with an Earth-like pressure would survive for longer than 1 Gyr. Simulations of the planet have shown that TOI-700 d is a robust candidate for a habitable world. The simulated spectral feature depths from transmission spectra and the peak flux and variations from synthesized phase curves do not exceed 10 ppm. This will likely prohibit JWST from characterizing the atmosphere of TOI-700 d.

In November 2021, a fourth possible planet, Earth-sized and receiving approximately 30% more flux from TOI-700 than earth does from the Sun, was found at the inner edge of the habitable zone of TOI-700. In January 2023 the existence of this planet, designated 700 e, was confirmed.

The system is near (but not in) orbital resonance: from planets b to d, period ratios are approximately 5:8, 4:7, 3:4.

See also
Habitable Planet Reality Check: TOI-700e Discovered by NASA’s TESS Mission

 Kepler-62f
 Kepler-186f
 Kepler-442b
 LHS 1140 b
 List of potentially habitable exoplanets
 Proxima Centauri b
 TRAPPIST-1e

Notes

References

External links
 TESS – Official WebSite
 ExoFOP TIC 150428135 TOI 700 in the Exoplanet Follow-up Observing Program website
 The First Habitable Zone Earth-sized Planet from TESS. I: Validation of the TOI-700 System, Emily A. Gilbert et al., 3 Jan 2020
 The First Habitable Zone Earth-Sized Planet From TESS II: Spitzer Confirms TOI-700 d, Joseph E. Rodriguez et al., 3 Jan 2020
 The First Habitable Zone Earth-sized Planet from TESS. III: Climate States and Characterization Prospects for TOI-700 d, Gabrielle Suissa et al., 3 Jan 2020

 

Dorado (constellation)
M-type main-sequence stars
700, TOI
J06282325-6534456
Planetary systems with four confirmed planets
Planetary transit variables